Ponders End is the southeasternmost part of Enfield, north London, centred on the Hertford Road. Situated to the west of the River Lee Navigation, it became industrialised through the 19th century, similar to the Lea Valley in neighbouring Edmonton and Brimsdown, with manufacturing giving way to warehousing in the late-20th century. The area consists heavily of social housing, with streets also lined with 19th and early-20th century suburban terraced housing.

As a result of increased levels of immigration, the area has become the most ethnically diverse part of Enfield, with the majority of the population now belonging to an ethnic minority background as first recorded in the 2011 census. The area is undergoing large-scale regeneration, with the high-rise Alma Road Estate currently undergoing demolition and redevelopment by Countryside Properties. The population of Ponders End was 15,664 as of 2011.

Geography
Two north–south railway lines enclose the residential parts of the area, bounded east and west by estates of warehousing, industrial and commercial use

Its northern and southern limits are along Hertford Road at The Ride and The Boundary pubs (north to south). Its loosely defined east and west limits coalesce around Wharf Road in the east and the Southbury station or Kingsway in the west.

Etymology
Ponders End is marked on the Ordnance Survey map of 1822. It was recorded in 1593 as Ponders ende meaning the "end or quarter of the parish associated with the Ponder family" from the Middle English ende. John Ponder is mentioned in a document of 1373; the surname is believed to mean a "keeper of, or dweller by, a fish-pond or mill-pond".

History

All but a southern belt of the district was in Enfield, as the south lay in Edmonton, the parishes becoming a civil and ecclesiastical after a split of functions in the 1860s, which saw the final secularisation of government, the disestablishment of the vestries following the increase in Poor Law Unions in the hundred years before.
 
Through the 19th century the area became industrialised, due to its straight road and waterway network up and down the Lea Valley including the 17th century River Lee Navigation. The first major firm to arrive was Grout, Baylis & Co, who were established in Norwich in 1807 as crape manufacturers, the material being used for widows' weeds. They opened a dyeing and finishing plant in Ponders End two years later. Crape went out of fashion by late Victorian times, and the factory closed in 1894. The buildings were taken over by the United Flexible Tubing Company.

In 1866 the London Jute Works Company established a factory on the Navigation in a desolate area known locally as Spike Island. Many of the new employees came from Dundee, the traditional centre of the jute industry in Scotland. The jute works closed in 1882, to be replaced by the Ediswan factory. Over the years the factory was enlarged, eventually covering , and employing many people, notably girls, from the area. Ediswan produced electric lamps, and the factory was colloquially known as The Lamp. They also manufactured appliances for the shipping and aviation industries, mechanical pianos and butter makers.

To the south of Ponder's End Lock a factory making white lead was built in 1893. Further south of that factory, the Cortecine works produced floor-cloth and carpet backing. By 1906 over 2000 people were employed in local factories. Another major industry in the latter years of the 19th century was horticulture. Tomatoes and cucumbers were the principal produce but flowers and fruit were also grown in the many orchards and greenhouses to the north of the locality. During World War I, a huge munitions factory, the Ponders End Shell Works was built in Wharf Road. The factory building was sold after the war. Further factories were built in the 1930s alongside the newly built Great Cambridge Road.

Today (2009) little remains of manufacturing and much of the area has given way to warehousing and residential developments. Aesica pharmaceutical manufacturers (formerly Thomas Morson Ltd) closed its plant in 2011. Wright's Flour Mill, the oldest working industrial building in the borough remains, some of its buildings having been constructed in the 18th century.

On 7 August 2011 Ponders End was the scene of copy-cat riots which spread from Tottenham to neighbouring districts.

In Spring 2017, Camden Town Brewery completed a new facility in Ponders End on the western bank of the Lee Navigation.

In August 2020, Beavertown Brewery opened "Beaverworld", a new brewery on a six-acre plot on the western bank of the Lee Navigation, creating up to 150 jobs.

Popular culture
Critchley & Simmons released an album titled Ponders End in 2017 - inspired by the area where they first met.

Musician Jah Wobble was inspired to write his (2005) album Mu by his experiences in the Lea Valley and Ponders End.

Ponders End Allotments Club is a track from the (1975) Chas and Dave album One Fing 'n' Annuver.

Historic buildings

 Wright's Flour Mill The oldest working industrial building in Enfield.
 Ponders End Pumping Station. Built in 1899 by the East London Waterworks Company. In 1995 the half-timbered building was converted into a public house called the Navigation a Harvester restaurant. Located on the west bank of the Lee Navigation, with views towards the grassed embankment of the King George V Reservoir and close to Ponder's End Lock.

Nearest places
 Brimsdown
 Enfield Highway
 Edmonton, London
 Enfield Town
 Bush Hill Park
 Chingford

Watercourses

 River Lee Navigation
Flowing from the River Lee Navigation above Ponders End Lock across South Marsh close to the King George V Reservoir and following the western perimeter of the William Girling Reservoir to merge with the River Lee Diversion at Edmonton.

Sport
Angling is allowed on the River Lee Navigation upstream and downstream of Ponders End Lock. Information from the River Lea Anglers Club.

Transport
Ponders End railway station
 Southbury railway station
London Bus Routes 191, 279, 349, 491, 377, 121, 307, 313 and N279 serve the area.

Local rail services

Lea Valley Lines serving all stations to Hertford East via the Southbury Loop and to Stratford
West Anglia Main Line stopping services to Bishops Stortford and to Stratford

Demography
The 2011 census showed that 45% of the population was white (26% British, 17% Other, 2% Irish), 16% Black African and 8% Bangladeshi.

Notable people
 James and John Chambers pioneers in South Australia in Stuart expeditions.
 John Hollowbread, footballer
 Christopher Hughes, former Mastermind and International Mastermind winner both in 1983
 Stephen Mangan, actor
 Dave Peacock, musician
 Norman Tebbit, politician
 Chijindu Ujah, Olympic sprinter

Local newspapers
The local newspapers are as of 2011:
Enfield Independent 
Enfield Advertiser

Politics
After boundary changes in 2010 - Ponders End became one of seven wards which form the Edmonton parliamentary constituency. The MP for constituency is Kate Osamor.

Schools
 Secondary schools: Oasis Academy Hadley and Heron Hall Academy
 Primary Schools: Kingfisher Hall Primary Academy, St Mary's RC Primary School, Alma Primary School, Southbury Primary School, St Matthew's CoE Primary School, Oasis Academy Hadley
 Special schools: Waverley School

Higher education
 Middlesex University, Enfield Campus (now closed)
 The College of Haringey, Enfield and North East London

Places of worship
 Church of St Matthew, Church of England
 Church of Mary, Mother of God, Roman Catholic church
 Jalalia Jamme Mosque
 Lincoln Road Chapel, Lincoln Road.
 Ponders End Methodist Church, High Street.
 United Reformed Church, College Close, High Street.

Open spaces

 Ponders End Park, formerly Ponders End Recreation Ground and Ryan's Park.

External links
 Ponders End photographs
 Wrights flour mill
 Ponders End a history
 Ponders End flour mill conservation area

References

Places in Enfield, London
Areas of London
Districts of the London Borough of Enfield
Places formerly in Middlesex